The Department of Culture and the Arts was part of the Government of Western Australia.

Preceding authorities
The earlier governmental agencies or authorities concerning the arts were advisory boards or councils; it was not until 1986 that the  department for the Arts was created.

The Department of the Arts was to co-ordinate and review the major cultural institutions, incorporating the Censorship Office and absorbing the activities of the Western Australian Arts Council. The department was given the responsibility of ensuring artistic and financial evaluation and accountability from receipts of arts grants.

It was followed by the Ministry for Culture and the Arts, which existed between 1997 and 2001.

The department
The department was known as the Department of Culture and the Arts and it commenced operating on 1 July 2001 and was amalgamated into the Department of Local Government, Sport and Cultural Industries on 1 July 2017.
The Culture and the Arts department portfolio included the Art Gallery of Western Australia, the State Library of Western Australia, the Western Australian Museum, the Perth Theatre Trust, and Screenwest.

State Living Treasures
Former Minister for Arts, The Hon. Peter Foss QC MLC, initiated the State Living Treasures Awards in 1998 to honour artists whose lifetime work had enhanced the artistic and cultural life of Western Australia.

The Minister presented the awards at a special ceremony at Kings Park on Western Australia Proclamation Day, 21 October 1998.

The awards were also presented in 2004 by The Hon. Sheila McHale MLA, former Minister for Culture and the Arts.

In 2015 they were awarded by The Hon. John Day MLA, former Minister for Culture and the Arts at a ceremony at the Art Gallery of Western Australia in October 2015.

2015 Recipients

Faith Clayton, Actress
Stephanie Coleman
Robert Drewe
Pippin Drysdale
Alan Griffiths
Joan London Author
Dr Mary McLean
Noriko Yoshimoto, Puppeteer
Chrissie Parrott, Dancer, Choreographer, Director, Teacher
Herbert Pinter, Production Designer
Nalda Searles, Visual Artist
Lew Smith, Musician
Miriam Stannage Painter, Photographer, Printmaker
Dr Richard Walley, Musician, Dancer, Painter, Writer, Director, Indigenous Activist, Educator
Dave Warner Musician

Past recipients

2004
Alan Alder, 
Dr Lucette Aldous, Ballerina
Janangoo Butcher Cherel, 
Jimmy Chi, Composer, Musician, Playwright
Professor Jeffrey Howlett AM, Architect
Tom Hungerford AM - journalist, novelist, playwright
Doris Pilkington Garimara - writer
Dr Carol Rudyard - visual artist
Professor Roger Smalley - composer, musician, conductor
Leonard 'Jack' Williams - Aboriginal custodian, storyteller, craftsman
Richard Woldendorp - photographer
Fay Zwicky - poet, fiction writer, editor

1998
Madame Kira Bousloff, 
Madame Alice Carrard, 
Peter Cowan, Writer
Jack Davis, Playwright
Margaret Ford, 
Vaughan Hanly, 
Elizabeth Jolley,
Robert Juniper, 
Queenie McKenzie,
Paul Sampi, 
Howard Taylor.

Distinguished artists
(having passed away prior to the 1998 awards)
Joan Campbell, 
Rover Thomas.

Notes

Culture and the Arts
2001 establishments in Australia
Western Australia
2017 disestablishments in Australia
Government agencies established in 2001
Government agencies disestablished in 2017